Michael Ahearn may refer to:

 Mike Ahearn (Michael F. Ahearn, 1878–1948), athletic director and football coach at Kansas State University
 Michael J. Ahearn (born 1956/7), CEO of First Solar